Robert Nisbet Bain (1854–1909) was a British historian and linguist who worked for the British Museum.

Life
Bain was born in London in 1854 to David and Elizabeth (born Cowan) Bain.

Bain was a fluent linguist who could use over twenty languages. Besides translating a number of books he also used his skills to write learned books on foreign people and folklore. Bain was a frequent contributor to the Encyclopædia Britannica. His contributions were biographies and varied from Andrew Aagensen to Aleksander Wielopolski. He taught himself Hungarian in order that he could read Mór Jókai in the original after first reading him in German. He translated from Finnish, Danish and Russian and also tackled Turkish authors via Hungarian. He was the most prolific translator into English from Hungarian in the nineteenth century. He married late and died young after publishing a wide range of literature from or about Europe.

He is buried in Brookwood Cemetery.

Works 
 Gustavus III. and his contemporaries 1746-1792. 2 Bände. London: Kegan Paul, Trench, Trübner, 1894.
 The daughter of Peter the Great. A history of Russian diplomacy. Westminster: Archibald Constable, 1899
 Peter III. Emperor of Russian. The story of a crisis and a crime. London: Archibald Constable, 1902.
Biography of Leo Tolstoy, 1903.
 Scandinavia. A political history of Denmark, Norway and Sweden from 1513 to 1900. Cambridge: University Press, 1905
 The First Romanovs. A History of Moscovite Civilisation and the Rise of Modern Russia Under Peter the Great and His Forerunners.  1905.  Reprint, New York:  Russell & Russell, 1967. 
 Slavonic Europe: A Political History of Poland and Russia from 1447 to 1796, Cambridge University Press, 1908.
 The last King of Poland and his contemporaries. London: Methuen, 1909
 Charles XII and the Collapse of the Swedish Empire 1682-1719, NA Kessinger Pub. Co. 2006, .

Translations 
 Russian Fairy Tales, 1892
 Cossack Fairy Tales and Folk Tales, London : Lawrence and Bullen 1894
 Turkish Fairy Tales and Folk Tales, 1896
 Tales from Tolstoi, 1901
 Tales from Gorky, 1902

Translations
 Mór Jókai:
Egy Magyar Nábob, 1850; engl. A Hungarian Nabob, New York : DOUBLEDAY, PAGE & COMPANY 1899
 The Day of Wrath
 The Poor Plutocrats
 Jonas Lauritz Idemil Lie:
 Weird Tales from Northern Seas

Bibliography 
 Elias Bredsdorff: Danish Literature in English Translation; in: Orbis Litterarum 5 (1) 1947, S. 187–257.
 L. C. Wharton: Transcription of Foreign Tongues; in: Transactions of the Philological Society 29 (1), S. 59–112
 Roxoliana Zorivchak: The First English Translations of Ukrainian Fairy Tales; in: Forum 62 (Summer 1985): S. 9–11.

References

External links 

 
 
 

1854 births
1909 deaths
Linguists from the United Kingdom
Employees of the British Museum
19th-century British translators
Burials at Brookwood Cemetery
Hungarian–English translators